Honorato Trosso, (born January 27, 1970 in Luanda) is a former Angolan basketball player. Trosso, a 6 ft 6in / 190 lb Small forward, played for Angola at the 1994 World Championship and 1996 Summer Olympics.

See also
Angola national basketball team

References

External links
 
FIBA.com Profile

Basketball-Reference Profile

1970 births
Living people
Basketball players from Luanda
Angolan men's basketball players
Basketball players at the 1996 Summer Olympics
Olympic basketball players of Angola
Atlético Petróleos de Luanda basketball players
Small forwards
1994 FIBA World Championship players